The Phu Quoc Island forest skink (Sphenomorphus phuquocensis) is a species of skink found in Vietnam.

References

phuquocensis
Reptiles described in 2020
Reptiles of Vietnam